Chymase is an enzyme that in humans is encoded by the CMA1 gene.

This gene product is a chymotryptic serine proteinase that belongs to the peptidase family S1. It is expressed in mast cells and thought to function in the degradation of the extracellular matrix, the regulation of submucosal gland secretion, and the generation of vasoactive peptides. In the heart and blood vessels, this protein, rather than angiotensin converting enzyme, is largely responsible for converting angiotensin I to the vasoactive peptide angiotensin II. Angiotensin II has been implicated in blood pressure control and in the pathogenesis of hypertension, cardiac hypertrophy, and heart failure. Thus, this gene product is a target for cardiovascular disease therapies. This gene maps to 14q11.2 in a cluster of genes encoding other proteases.

References

Further reading

External links